Universitario is Spanish for university student. It is the name of several football clubs, sports clubs, and stadiums in Latin America and Europe.

Universitario may refer to:

Clubs

Football
Club Universitario de Deportes, a Peruvian football club based in Lima
Universitario de Sucre, a Bolivian football club based in Sucre
Técnico Universitario, an Ecuadorian football club based in Ambato
Universitario de Pando, a Bolivian football club based in Pando
Universitario Popayán, a Colombian football club based in Popayán
Universitario de La Paz, a Bolivian football club
Universitario de Trujillo, a Peruvian football club based in Trujillo
Juventud Unida Universitario, an Argentine football club based in San Luis
Grupo Universitario de Tandil, an Argentine football club based in Tandil

Other sports
Club Universitario de Buenos Aires, an Argentine sports club based in Buenos Aires known for its rugby union team
Universitario Rugby Club de Tucumán, an Argentine rugby union club based in San Miguel de Tucumán
Club Universitario de Córdoba, an Argentine sports club based in Córdoba known for its rugby union team
Club Universitario de La Plata, an Argentine sports club based in La Plata known for its rugby union and field hockey teams
Club Universitario de Rosario, an Argentine sports club based in Rosario known for its rugby union team
Urunday Universitario, a Uruguayan sports club based in Prado, Montevideo known for its basketball team
Centro Desportivo Universitário de Lisboa, a Portuguese university sports club based in Lisbon known for its rugby union team
Centro Desportivo Universitário do Porto, a Portuguese university sports club based in Porto known for its rugby union team
Círculo Universitario de Quilmes, an Argentine sports club based in Quilmes, Buenos Aires known for its rugby union and field hockey teams

Stadiums
Estadio Universitario, a stadium in Nuevo León, Mexico belonging to the Universidad Autónoma de Nuevo León and home of football club Tigres UANL
Estadio Olímpico Universitario, an Olympic stadium in Mexico City belonging to the National Autonomous University of Mexico and home of Club Universidad Nacional
Estadio Universitario Alberto Chivo Cordova, a stadium in Toluca, Mexico
Estadio Universitario de Caracas, a baseball stadium in Caracas, Venezuela belonging to the Central University of Venezuela
Estádio Universitário de Lisboa, a stadium in Lisbon, Portugal home of the Portugal national rugby union team
Estadio Universitario Beto Ávila, a baseball stadium in Veracruz, Mexico
Estadio Universitario UES, a multi-use stadium in San Salvador, El Salvador, home of Universidad de El Salvador
Estádio Universitário São Paulo, a football stadium in São Paulo, Brazil, home of University of São Paulo's football team

Other
Clásico Universitario, a rivalry between Chilean football clubs Universidad de Chile and Universidad Católica

See also
Universitatea (disambiguation)